These are the rosters of all participating teams at the women's water polo tournament at the 2016 Summer Olympics in Rio de Janeiro.

Pool A

Australia
The following is the Australian roster in the women's water polo tournament of the 2016 Summer Olympics.

Head coach: Greg McFadden

Brazil
The following is the Brazilian roster in the women's water polo tournament of the 2016 Summer Olympics.

Head coach:  Patrick Oaten

Italy
The following is the Italian roster in the women's water polo tournament of the 2016 Summer Olympics.

Head coach: Fabio Conti

Russia
The following is the Russian roster in the women's water polo tournament of the 2016 Summer Olympics.

Head coach: Alexandr Gaidukov

Pool B

China
The following is the Chinese roster in the women's water polo tournament of the 2016 Summer Olympics.

Head coach:  Ricardo Azevedo

Hungary
The following is the Hungarian roster in the women's water polo tournament of the 2016 Summer Olympics.

Head coach: Attila Bíró

Spain
The following is the Spanish roster in the women's water polo tournament of the 2016 Summer Olympics.

Head coach: Miki Oca

United States

The following is the American roster in the women's water polo tournament of the 2016 Summer Olympics.

Head coach: Adam Krikorian

See also
Water polo at the 2016 Summer Olympics – Men's team rosters

References

External links
Official website

Women's team rosters
2016
2016 in women's water polo
Women's water polo competitions